Tim Hughes (born 1978) is a British worship leader and singer-songwriter.

Tim Hughes may also refer to:
Tim Hughes (cricketer) (born 1943), British cricketer
Tim Hughes (announcer) (born 1959), American sports announcer